KDPP may refer to:

 Kurdish Democratic Progressive Party, a Syrian Kurdish political party
 KVMX (AM), a radio station whose former callsign was "KDPP"